The Test of English for International Communication (TOEIC) is an international standardized test of English language proficiency for non-native speakers. It is intentionally designed to measure the everyday English skills of people working in an international environment.

There are different forms of the exam: The TOEIC Listening & Reading Test consists of two equally graded tests of comprehension assessment activities totaling a possible 990 score; There are also the TOEIC Speaking and Writing Tests. The TOEIC speaking test is composed of tasks that assess pronunciation, intonation and stress, vocabulary, grammar, cohesion, relevance of content and completeness of content. The TOEIC Writing test is composed of tasks that assess grammar, relevance of sentences to the pictures, quality and variety of sentences, vocabulary, organization, and whether the opinion is supported with reason and/or examples. Both assessments use a score scale of 0 – 200.

TOEIC Listening & Reading Test

The TOEIC Listening & Reading Test lasts two hours [45 minutes for Listening, and 75 minutes for Reading]. It  consists of 200 multiple-choice items evenly divided between the listening and reading comprehension section. Each question is worth five scores. So each candidate receives independent scores for listening and reading comprehension on a scale from 0 to 495 points. The total score adds up to a scale from 0 to 990 points. The TOEIC certificate exists in five colors, corresponding to achieved results:
 orange (0–219)
 brown (220–469)
 green (470–729)
 blue (730–859)
 gold (860–990)

TOEIC test certificates are optional, unofficial documents that are meant for display only.

TOEIC Speaking & Writing Test

The TOEIC Speaking & Writing Tests were introduced in 2006. Test takers receive separate scores for each of the two tests, or they can take the Speaking test without taking the Writing test and vice versa. The Speaking test assesses pronunciation, intonation and stress, vocabulary, grammar, cohesion, relevance of content and completeness of content, while the Writing test assesses grammar, relevance of sentences to the pictures, quality and variety of sentences, vocabulary, organization, and whether the opinion is supported with reason and/or examples. The tests are designed to reflect actual English usage in the workplace, though they do not require any knowledge of specialized business terms. The TOEIC Speaking Test takes approximately 20 minutes to complete; the TOEIC writing test lasts approximately 60 minutes. Each test has a score range between 0–200, with test takers grouped into eight proficiency levels for Speaking and nine proficiency levels for Writing.

History
The US-based Educational Testing Service (ETS) developed the TOEIC test to measure achievement in using English in a business setting. Yasuo Kitaoka was the central figure of the Japanese team that conceived the basic idea of the TOEIC test.

ETS's major competitors are Cambridge University, which administers the IELTS, FCE, CAE, and CPE and Trinity College London, which administers GESE and ISE exams.

2006 Redesigned TOEIC tests
A new version of the TOEIC Listening & Reading test was released in 2006. The changes can be summarized as follows:
Overall, passages are longer.
Part 1 has fewer questions involving photograph descriptions.
The Listening Section hires speakers of English from Britain, Australia, New Zealand and North America, and uses an equal distribution of the dialects. However, all the voice actors for the audio sections have lived in the United States for an extended period.
Part 6 no longer contains an error-spotting task, criticized as unrealistic in a corporate environment, instead adopting the use of a task wherein the test taker fills in blanks in incomplete sentences.
Part 7 contains not only single-passage questions but also double-passage questions wherein the test taker reads and compares the two related passages, such as an e-mail correspondence.

The lower the score the test taker achieves, the more marked this tendency becomes. As many as 85.6% of those who earned scores ranging from 0 to 395 points find the revised TOEIC test more difficult, while 69.9% of those who earned 400 to 495 points think this way, as do 59.3% of those who earned 500 to 595 points. Among those who achieved 600 to 695 points 58.9% agree with these findings. 700 to 795 points 48.6%, 800 to 895 points 47.9%, and 900 to 990 points 39.8%.

2006 also saw the addition of TOEIC Speaking & Writing tests. In 2007 there were additional changes to the TOEIC Reading & Listening test that decreased emphasis on knowledge of grammatical rules.

How the TOEIC Listening and Reading test is scored

Scores on the TOEIC Listening and Reading test are determined by the number of correct answers. The number of correct responses on each section is multiplied by five and converted to a scaled score. Three TOEIC Listening and Reading scaled scores are given for each examinee:

οne for the Listening Section
οne for the Reading Section
οne Total Score that consists of the sum of the Listening Section and Reading Section sub-scores.

Each sub-score can range from 0 to 495 points. The Total Score ranges from 0 to 990. There is no negative scoring. The Total Score consists of the sum of the Listening Section and Reading Section sub-scores.

In 2016, the TOEIC system changed for the first time in 10 years. ETS said that the changes to  the TOEIC would reflect the use of online communication in modern society.

In Japan and South Korea, a new version of TOEIC was created that includes chart comprehension questions.

Test accommodations 

Below are the types of accommodations commonly given:

 extended testing time
 additional rest breaks
 reader
 scribe
 recorder to mark answers
 headphones
 alternate test formats, e.g. Braille, enlarged print
 alternate response formats, e.g. computer for writing section
 wheelchair access

TOEIC in Japan
The  operates the TOEIC test in Japan, where nearly 2.4 million people (as of 2014) take the test; 1.3M for institutional program (IP) and 1.1M for secure program (SP).

There are two ways to take the TOEIC test properly. The TOEIC SP Test was renewed in May 2006, followed by the TOEIC IP Test in April 2007 in line so that it would be with the SP Test.

The TOEIC Speaking Test/Writing Test started on January 21, 2007 in addition to the TOEIC SP Test and the TOEIC IP Test.

Scandal
The Institute for International Business Communication (IIBC), the non-profit organization that administers the TOEIC in Japan, was the subject of a scandal in 2009.

In May and June 2009, articles in the Japanese weekly magazine FRIDAY accused the IIBC's 92-year-old chairman Yaeji Watanabe of nepotism when he appointed the son of his girlfriend to the position of chairman of the IIBC board of directors. To force the appointment, half of the volunteers serving on the board were driven out by Watanabe. The magazine article also questioned why Watanabe only showed up for work about one day a week.

In his defense, Watanabe claimed that he held a ceremonial title and was chairman in name only. As a result, Watanabe claimed that he had little to do with the decision to appoint the son of his girlfriend to the position. The magazine article concluded by asking why someone who is chairman only in name and only working one day a week should receive an annual salary in excess of 25 million yen (approximately US$300,000).

In August 2009, the online version of the English-language newspaper The Japan Times published a two-part series examining the TOEIC's origins and early history as well as the use of test-taker fees by the IIBC on the internet. The August 18 article examined the questionable uses of test fees, including a fivefold increase in utility expenses in one year, 13 million spent annually on research about adapting to Chinese culture, sponsorship of poetry readings by the Chinese Poetry Recitation Association, and membership fees to join the Beautiful Aging Association, for which Watanabe happened to be chairman.

The article also questioned the relationship between the IIBC and its for-profit partner International Communications School with which it shared office space. International Communications School is responsible for selling the TOEIC Institutional Program Test given by companies and schools; publishes IIBC-approved TOEIC preparation textbooks; and administers the TOEIC Japanese language website. One of International Communications School's subsidiaries is E-Communications, which administers the TOEIC's online application system and provides online TOEIC study materials.

In 2009, Watanabe suddenly resigned from the IIBC, leaving the son of his girlfriend in charge of the non-profit. Watanabe received a 25 million yen retirement payment.

The IIBC lowered the price of the TOEIC Secure Program Test from 6,615 yen to 5,985 yen starting with the September 13, 2009 test. The price had to be lowered due to pressure from the Ministry of Trade, which instructed the IIBC to reduce the profits being generated by the test.

In July 2010, the Tokyo Tax Bureau announced that International Communications School, IIBC's for-profit partner, hid 100 million yen in income and had to pay 30 million yen in back taxes and fines.

TOEIC in South Korea
Toward the end of 2005, there was a shift in South Korea, regarded as the second biggest consumer of TOEIC per capita.  However, a person's TOEIC score is still a major factor in hiring people for most professional jobs in South Korea.
Starting in 2011, Korean universities will no longer be allowed to use TOEIC and TOEFL scores as part of the admission process. However, many universities in Korea still require a minimum score of 900.  This is apparently to discourage private English education (there are many private institutions that teach TOEIC-based classes). Another English proficiency test, TEPS (developed by Seoul National University, Chosun Ilbo), has been developed and may replace the status of TOEIC.

TOEIC in Europe
In France, some Grandes écoles require a TOEIC score of at least 785 to award the diploma. This policy has been criticized, as it makes state-awarded diplomas dependent on a private institution—despite the fact that it was not the private institution that set the 785 mark but a recommendation from the Commission des titres d'ingénieur indicating a B2+ level on the Common European Framework of Reference for Languages.
Students that cannot achieve a 785 mark are offered to validate their diploma by other means in most of the schools. Some institutions delay the diploma for 1 year after the end of the studies in that case.

In Greece, TOEIC is accepted by ASEP, the organization responsible for hiring new employees to work for the government. It is administered by the Hellenic American Union and it is offered weekly in most major cities in Greece.

TOEIC in the United Kingdom
The TOEIC was a Home Office accredited test for students applying for a UK visa.

In 2014 an undercover investigation by the BBC program Panorama exposed systematic cheating and fraud by a number of organizations and individuals involved in running the test. Cheating was found to take place at Eden College International in London, where freelance invigilators used to conduct the exam. The college claimed no prior knowledge of the cheating, and had previously sacked three invigilators. ETS stated it does not hire the invigilators and that it does everything it can to prevent cheating.

On 17 April 2014, ETS decided not to renew its license as a provider of a Secure English Language Test (SELT). This means that these English language tests are no longer honored for the purpose of being issued a UK visa.

In June 2014, the Home Office undertook its own investigation and claimed to have found 46,000 “invalid and questionable” tests. It suspended the TOEIC exam as being valid for entry to the UK. It also canceled the visas of around 45,000 students, seventy percent of whom were Indian. Some left voluntarily with the majority being deported.

In March 2016, a tribunal ruled that the evidence the Home Office used to deport the students was not strong enough. , over 300 legal appeals against the government were pending, and the National Audit Office had opened an investigation into the government's handling of the issue, which some Members of Parliament had likened to the Windrush scandal.

TOEIC in the United States
Both the TOEIC Listening & Reading and the TOEIC Speaking & Writing tests are now available in the United States. While the TOEIC Listening & Reading test has been available for decades, the TOEIC Speaking & Writing test was introduced in the United States only in 2009. Registration for the TOEIC Speaking & Writing test is handled by the English4Success division of the nonprofit organization Amideast.

TOEIC in Thailand
The Center for Professional Assessment offers regular institutional testing every Monday through Saturday at 9:00AM and 1:00PM (local time). The TOEIC test is a two-hour multiple-choice test that consists of 200 questions divided into 100 questions each in listening comprehension and reading comprehension. Each candidate receives independent marks for written and oral comprehension on a scale from 0 to 495 points. The total score adds up to a scale from 0 to 990 points.

TOEIC Bridge Test
ETS also administers another  version of the TOEIC test called TOEIC Bridge. The TOEIC Bridge test targets beginning and intermediate learners and consists of 100 multiple-choice questions, requiring about one hour of testing time.

TOEIC Bridge in Chile
The TOEIC Bridge was used in Chile as part of the 2010 SIMCE test.

See also
 English language learning and teaching
 G-TELP, General Tests of English Language Proficiency
 IELTS, International English Language Testing System
 TEPS, Test of English Proficiency
 TOEFL, Test of English as a Foreign Language

References
McCrostie, James, "TOEIC no turkey at 30", Japan Times, August 11, 2009.
McCrostie, James, "TOEIC: Where does the money go?", Japan Times, August 18, 2009.

External links
 Official page

Standardized tests for English language